Berta Hall (21 September 1909 – 6 June 1999) was a Swedish film actress. She appeared in 18 films between 1942 and 1988.

Biography
Berta Hall was the daughter of Carl Hall (1862-1929), owner and editor of the newspaper Norra Bohuslän. He sent her to Stockholm to attend Palmgrenska samskolan. After graduating in 1929, she began theater studies with Julia Håkansson.

Selected filmography
 Port of Call (1948)
 One Summer of Happiness (1951)
 In the Arms of the Sea (1951)

References

External links

1909 births
1999 deaths
Swedish film actresses
20th-century Swedish actresses